Oxyothespis sudanensis is a species of praying mantis in the family Toxoderidae.

See also
List of mantis genera and species

References

sudanensis
Insects described in 1916